Galina Dimitrova Ivanova (in Bulgarian: Галина Димитрова Иванова), known professionally as Kali (in Bulgarian: Кали) is a Bulgarian singer. She was born in October 1975 in Sofia. She has 3 children. She's best known for her 1998 song "4-4-2" . It was a huge hit in the country due to Bulgaria's first appearance in the FIFA World Cup since 1994. Ivanova explained that the idea of the song was to give a motivational push to the Bulgarian team, and openly dislikes it.
Kali has 7 studio albums, 1 duet album and 1 compilation album, all under different labels. She is signed with Payner since 2010.

Discography

Studio albums
 Vzemi me (1998)
 Parfiumat (1999)
 Razgday mi (2000)
 Edno mersi (2002)
 Za teb (2004)
 Sheto chuvstvo (2006)
 Silna (2012)

Duet albums
 Dve v edno [with Romski Perli Orchestra] (1998)

Compilation albums
 The best of - Remiksiray me (2008)

References

External links 
 Kali at Facebook
 Kali at Instagram
 Kali at payner.bg

Living people
1975 births
20th-century Bulgarian women singers
Bulgarian folk-pop singers
Bulgarian folk singers
Musicians from Sofia
Payner artists
21st-century Bulgarian women singers